GCS Credit Union Ballpark is a minor league baseball facility in Sauget, Illinois, that serves as the home ballpark for the Gateway Grizzlies of the Frontier League.  The Grizzlies' ballpark was built in time for the start of the 2002 season, under the original name of GMC Stadium.  GCS Ballpark features reserved box seating, lawn seating, party suites, two hot tubs, and a section of bleacher seating. With the bleacher section added in 2004, the stadium's capacity has increased to 6,000 fans. In 2004, the Grizzlies became the first team in Frontier League history to draw over 200,000 fans for a season, finishing with a league best 217,500.  ProGrass synthetic turf was installed at GCS Ballpark in January 2012.

GCS Ballpark hosted the 2008 NCAA Division II Baseball Championship.  The stadium also serves as the host for the annual wood-bat college baseball game between the Billikens of Saint Louis University and the Salukis of Southern Illinois University.  The ballpark is also home for Webster University and Lindenwood University – Belleville.

GCS Ballpark sells a unique food item called "Baseball's Best Burger", a variant of the Luther Burger. It consists of a bacon cheeseburger with a Krispy Kreme Original Glazed doughnut used as a bun. The ballpark and the burger were showcased in a special baseball-themed episode in season 2 of the Travel Channel's Man v. Food. along with their nachos

References

External links 
GCS Credit Union Ballpark at the Gateway Grizzlies website
GCS Credit Union Ballpark at the Webster University Athletics website

Minor league baseball venues
College baseball venues in the United States
Baseball venues in Illinois
Baseball venues in St. Louis
Frontier League ballparks
Lindenwood University – Belleville
2002 establishments in Illinois
Sports venues completed in 2002
Webster University